William S. Tornabene (born  March 14, 1942) is former American football player and coach.

Playing career
Tornabene played college football at the Virginia Military Institute (VMI) from 1961 to 1963 and was co-captain of the team his senior year.  This would have included the 1963 Oyster Bowl loss against Navy.

Coaching career
Tornabene was the head football coach at Waynesburg University in Waynesburg, Pennsylvania, serving for four seasons, from 1983 to 1986, and compiling a record of 16–21–1.

Tornabene had previously served several terms in the assistant coaching staff at Waynesberg, including a term under future Miami Dolphins assistant coach Mike Scarry.  He also was an assistant coach at VMI and head coach at Peters Township High School in McMurray, Pennsylvania.

Head coaching record

College

References

1942 births
Living people
American football centers
VMI Keydets football coaches
VMI Keydets football players
Waynesburg Yellow Jackets football coaches
High school football coaches in Pennsylvania
Sportspeople from  Pittsburgh
Players of American football from Pittsburgh